No.5551 The Unknown Warrior is a replica LMS Patriot Class steam locomotive which is under construction in the Midland Railway – Butterley's West Shed.

The locomotive is a replica of the final 'Patriot' class locomotive to be built, 5551. The original locomotive was built in May 1934, and withdrawn in June 1962 (it was scrapped that October). Unlike the original engine, which never received a name, the new one will be named "The Unknown Warrior"; the name was chosen by public poll.

All of the original un-rebuilt LMS Patriot Class locomotives were withdrawn by November 1962 and the whole class was withdrawn by December 1965 with none of the engines (un-rebuilt or rebuilt) surviving into preservation.

Original engine
The original 5551/45551 was built at Crewe Works in May 1934 and unlike many other members of its class which were given names, it alongside nine other class members was not named. Sheds that it was allocated to over the years included: Crewe North (5A), Carlisle Upperby (12B), Camden (1B), Willesden (1A) and Edge Hill (8A). Edge Hill was the last shed it was allocated to, being transferred there in June 1961 and remaining there for twelve months until withdrawal.

It was also one of thirty four members of its class to be kept in its original unrebuilt condition prior to its final withdrawal in June 1962, its final working life was twenty eight years and one month. It was later cut up for scrap in October of the same year at its birthplace Crewe Works.

Replica

Overview
The LMS-Patriot Project, a registered charity in England and Wales ( 6502248 / No. 1123521), is constructing a replica locomotive at the West Shed, an engineering base for the Princess Royal Class Locomotive Trust, at the Midland Railway – Butterley.

 the project engineering update showed that the engine has had its wheels fitted and also the brake system, pistons, valves, motion plus boiler are all being worked on. In November it was announced by the group who were building "The Unknown Warrior" that there had been a few problems arising with the Royal British Legion who were supporting the construction of the engine, and with deep regret it was announced that the RBL could no longer support the loco group which also meant that the RBL's crest above the engines nameplates would have to be removed. A new set of crests would be placed above the engines nameplates as a result but the RBL will still support the Patriot project and vice versa as its still planned for the completed engine to be known as "The National Memorial Steam Engine".

In October 2018 the Llangollen Railway, where the locomotive had been assembled to date, announced that they were no longer able to build 5551, the decision being made due to the length of the list for the railways own locomotives that needed overhauls and repairs undertaking alongside other new build locomotive projects at the line including 6880 Betton Grange. The locomotive is currently at PRCLT's west shed on the Midland Railway near Butterley. An invitation to tender had been sent to four contractors who have expressed interest. The Princess Royal Class Locomotive Trust was chosen as they were deemed to best fit the requirements of 5551's board. Construction of the engine's boiler is now being undertaken at Heritage Boiler Steam Services Ltd in Liverpool.

Name, number and liveries

The original 5551/45551 never carried a name during its career under LMS & BR ownership, a competition was set up to choose a name for the new engine with examples of nameplates being: Patriot, Hero, Remembrance, Wilfred Owen, British Legion and The Falklands. Alongside names based on regiments, the military & war heroes there were other names entered into the competition which included: Henry Fowler, Winston Churchill, Sir Edward Elgar, Fred Dibnah, Robert Riddles, Baby Scot (nickname for class), Jack Mills (Great Train Robbery), Crewe & Llangollen.
Following a public vote to decide on the engines' name, the engine was named "The Unknown Warrior", after the tomb in London which holds an unidentified soldier who was killed on the battlefront during the First World War. It was also decided for the engine to carry the Royal British Legion's crest above its nameplates. Following a request by the RBL their crest had to be removed from the engine, a replacement crest was unveiled during a recent event in Crewe.

The liveries that the original Patriots wore included: LMS Crimson Lake, LMS Black, BR Black & BR Green. For a while during the locomotive's construction, the engine wore crimson lake on the left side of its cab and BR Green on the right, this being to give an idea to the public of what it would look like in either livery when completed and running. It was announced in November 2016 during the Patriot Group's annual meeting at Crewe Heritage Centre that the first livery that "The Unknown Warrior" would wear on completion would be LMS Crimson Lake, with the three remaining liveries applied at later dates.

Project launch
The project was formally launched at the Llangollen Patriot Gala in April 2008, by the project's first commercial sponsor, John Buxton, Managing Director of Cambrian Transport. The Frames Appeal was also announced at the gala and a membership scheme was later launched.

Project milestones

Construction
Although most parts that are being manufactured for "The Unknown Warrior" are brand new, a number of parts off fellow preserved engines will also be used. An example of parts that will be used in the construction of the Patriot include the leading front wheelset from LMS 8F 2-8-0 no 48518, a set of LMS Fowler Tenders (both of which being from Woodham Brothers scrapyard at Barry Island) are also going to be used in the project. Examples of new parts that will be constructed for "The Unknown Warrior" alongside the frame include the driving wheels and the second Fowler tender (the first having usable parts but not fit for re-use itself due to corrosion).

Frames
On 31 March 2009, two frame plates were cut at Corus Group plc Steel, Cradley Heath in the West Midlands. Measuring 39 ft in length 4 ft high and 1 1/8 in thick (28 mm), the frame plates were then taken to the Boro Foundry, at Lye, West Midlands, for machining and drilling, before being taken to the Llangollen Railway Works where assembly is in progress. The dragbox has been fitted to the frames, the front buffer beam fitted, the bogie bolster has been cast and has been fitted, all five of the five frame stretchers have been cast and are fitted to the frames.

Wheels
In September 2010, the first driving wheel was cast at the Boro Foundry, using the pattern made for LMS Jubilee Class 45699 Galatea. The two classes share the same size 6'9" driving wheels. The six new driving wheels have been cast by The Boro Foundry Stourbridge and machined and assembled by the South Devon Railway. In July 2021, it was reported that all six wheels had suffered from widespread metal fatigue cracking and would need to be replaced.

Boiler
At The LMS Patriot Project's 2010 AGM on 14 November, it was announced that the boiler for 'The Unknown Warrior' would be built by L&NWR Heritage at Crewe. The new boiler will be of traditional construction with a copper firebox. A fundraising campaign for the boiler for £1/2million has been launched. The smokebox and front tubeplate have been manufactured and were fitted to the locomotive in July 2013. The copper firebox was under construction at L&NWR Heritage at Crewe and was expected to be complete by the end of 2015, with construction of the boiler proper scheduled to begin in January 2016 with completion scheduled for the end of 2016. On 9 May 2017, L&NWR Heritage informed The LMS Patriot Project that it had decided to end all sub-contract work, and would not be completing the boiler. L&NWR Heritage did a little more work on the boiler, culminating in riveting the foundation ring to the inner firebox. The newly-formed Heritage Boiler Steam Services Ltd. was selected to complete the boiler, and on 30 November 2017 the partially-completed boiler was moved to HBSS' new facility.

Completion
The completion date was intended to be 2018 with a formal dedication planned for the 100th anniversary of the end of the First World War. That target was not met. It was later estimated that the locomotive might be in steam by late 2020. Again this was not met, not helped by the COVID-19 Pandemic.

See also
 Steam locomotives of the 21st century
 LNER Peppercorn Class A1 60163 Tornado
 Pennsylvania Railroad 5550
 GWR 6800 Class 6880 Betton Grange

References

External links
 
 Engineering news
 Project news
 The Unknown Warrior on ITV news
 Dedication of the engine's frames by the Royal British Legion
 The Unknown Warrior's crest unveiling

4-6-0 locomotives
Steam locomotives of the 21st century
Individual locomotives of Great Britain
Steam locomotives of Great Britain